South-Eastern Finland University of Applied Sciences (Xamk) is a University of Applied Sciences in Finland. It was established in the beginning of 2017, when Kymenlaakso University of Applied Sciences (Kyamk) and Mikkeli University of Applied Sciences (Mamk) merged. Xamk is the 5th largest university of applied sciences in Finland with 10 872 students and 914 staff members (662 in teaching and research personnel) across four campuses. Xamk is jointly owned by the cities of Mikkeli, Kotka, Savonlinna and Kouvola with Mikkeli holding a majority stake (52%) since August 2019.

Education 

Xamk's education, which is given on four different campuses, is closely connected to the requirements of working life and companies. As of 2021, Xamk offered in total 48 Bachelor's degree programmes and 32 Master's programmes and the number of students graduating annually was more than 1700.

Xamk offers six Bachelor's level degree programmes and three Master's level degree programmes in English:

 Bachelor of Business Administration, International Business (BBA) in Kouvola 
 Bachelor of Business Administration, Wellbeing Management (BBA) in Mikkeli 
 Bachelor of Culture and Arts, Game Design in Kouvola
 Bachelor of Engineering (BEng), Environmental engineering in Mikkeli
 Bachelor of Engineering (BEng), Information technology in Mikkeli
 Bachelor of Health Care, Nursing in Kotka
 Master of Business Administration, International Business Management in Kouvola
 Master of Health Care and Social Services, Rehabilitation (online)
 Master of Naprapathy in Kotka and online

Research and development 

Xamk is the largest University of Applied Sciences in Finland in terms of R&D activities carried out. The research carried out is mostly applied research in close co-operation with companies and most development efforts concentrate on regional development.

Research and development activities at Xamk are divided into four focus areas:
 Digital economy
 Forest, the environment and energy
 Logistics, marine technology and transport
 Sustainable well-being

References

External links
Official website

Universities and colleges in Finland
Educational institutions established in 2017
Mikkeli
Universities and colleges formed by merger in Finland
2017 establishments in Finland